This is a list of the Ukraine national football team results from 1992 to 2009 (Matches 1 – 162).

Results 

Key to background colours
 – indicates Ukraine won the match
 – indicates Ukraine's opposition won the match
 – indicates the match ended in a draw

1992

1993

1994

1995

1996

1997

1998

1999

2000

2001

2002

2003

2004

2005

2006

2007

2008

2009

Notes

References

External links

Ukraine national football team results
1990s in Ukrainian sport
2000s in Ukrainian sport